Clayton Latham (born 18 April 1980) is a long jumper from Saint Vincent and the Grenadines. Clayton Latham is the Vincentian National Record Holder, with a mark of 8.08m established in Hamburg, New York July 29, 2008.

Born in Toronto, Ontario, Latham competed at the 2009 World Athletics Championships in Berlin without reaching the final. Clayton Latham was a two-time NJCAA Division I All-American and Champion in the Long Jump while at Barton County Community College (2001-2003).

References

External links

Athletes from Toronto
1980 births
Living people
Canadian people of Saint Vincent and the Grenadines descent
Saint Vincent and the Grenadines long jumpers
Saint Vincent and the Grenadines male sprinters
Black Canadian track and field athletes
Sportspeople from Brampton
Barton Cougars men's track and field athletes
Junior college men's track and field athletes in the United States
World Athletics Championships athletes for Saint Vincent and the Grenadines
Competitors at the 2010 Central American and Caribbean Games